Firebird V11 is a studio album by Phil Manzanera, guitarist of rock band Roxy Music. The album's title refers to the guitar model Firebird VII, made by Gibson, a guitar with which Manzanera has had a long career and that was used on this album.

Manzanera met Polish pianist Leszek Możdżer while working with David Gilmour on his On an Island (2006) album and tour, particularly the final show at the Gdańsk shipyards at which Możdżer played piano.

Track listing
"Fortunately I Had One With Me" (William MacCormick) – 4:47
"Cartagena" (Manzanera) – 6:11
"FIReEBIReD" (Leszek Możdżer) – 5:57
"Mexican Hat" (Manzanera, Hayward, Możdżer, Stavi) – 10:42
"Firebird V11" (Manzanera) – 5:58
"A Few Minutes" (Stavi) – 7:12
"After Magritte" (Charles Hayward) – 7:18

Personnel
Phil Manzanera - Gibson Firebird VII guitar, vocals
Charles Hayward - Slingerland drums, vocals
Leszek Możdżer - piano, synthesizers, vocals
Yaron Stavi - bass guitar, acoustic bass, vocals
Technical
Jordi Teres, Mark McCarthy, Javier Goyes, Jamie Johnson - engineer
Lewis Hayward - photography

References

External links
 Firebirdv11.com - Official website for the album.

2008 albums
Instrumental albums
Phil Manzanera albums
Albums produced by Phil Manzanera